The fifth season of ABC reality television series The Bachelor premiered on April 7, 2004. The show featured 25-year-old Jesse Palmer, a professional football player from Nepean, Ontario. Palmer is the first Canadian and the youngest Bachelor lead in the show's history. The season concluded on May 19, 2004, with Palmer choosing to pursue a relationship with 22-year-old student Jessica Bowlin. They ended their relationship several weeks after the finale.

Contestants
The following is the list of bachelorettes for this season:

Future appearances
Palmer was named as the host for Bachelor Nation franchise in future content starting from The Bachelor season 26, replacing original host Chris Harrison.

Elimination Chart

 The contestant won the competition.
 The contestant was eliminated at the rose ceremony.

Episodes

References

05
2004 American television seasons
Television shows filmed in California
Television shows filmed in Texas
Television shows filmed in Oklahoma
Television shows filmed in Atlanta
Television shows filmed in Quebec
Television shows filmed in Washington, D.C.
Television shows filmed in the Bahamas
Television shows filmed in Indiana